The 2021 FC Edmonton season was the club's tenth competitive season as well as their third in the Canadian Premier League.

Overview 
The 2021 season was very disappointing for FC Edmonton. Edmonton's average home attendance of 961 was by far the lowest in the league, and the team finished in 7th out of 8 teams. Additionally, the club shut down its academy. However, there were some bright spots, including young Canadian forward Easton Ongaro who became the league's all time top goalscorer this season, and secured a transfer to Romania after the season ended.

Current squad
As of July 6, 2021.

Transfers

In

Transferred in

Loans in

Draft picks 
FC Edmonton selected the following players in the 2021 CPL–U Sports Draft on January 29, 2021. Draft picks are not automatically signed to the team roster. Only those who are signed to a contract will be listed as transfers in.

Out

Loans out

Competitions

Canadian Premier League

Table

Results by match

Matches

Canadian Championship

Statistics

Goalkeepers

References

2021
2021 Canadian Premier League
Canadian soccer clubs 2021 season
FC Ed